François Moreels (25 August 1903 – 8 August 1980) was a Belgian racing cyclist. He rode in the 1929 Tour de France.

References

1903 births
1980 deaths
Belgian male cyclists
Place of birth missing